Shaver is a former settlement in Fresno County, California. It was located at the north end of Shaver Lake, where a post office operated from 1896 to 1925. The site is now under the waters of Shaver Lake.

References

Former settlements in Fresno County, California
Former populated places in California
Submerged settlements in the United States
Destroyed towns
1896 establishments in California